The ancient Egyptian Harpoon, (archaeological, single-barbed type), is one of the oldest language hieroglyphs from ancient Egypt. It is used on the famous Narmer Palette of Pharaoh Narmer from the 31st century BC, in an archaic hieroglyphic form.

Language usage of harpoon
The hieroglyphic equivalent of the Harpoon is wꜥ, and means "1", a single item, and it is one of the 102 Egyptian biliterals; its use is extensive throughout the language history, and hieroglyphic tomb reliefs and story-telling of Ancient Egypt.

Rosetta Stone usage
In the 198 BC Rosetta Stone of Ptolemy V Epiphanes, the Harpoon hieroglyph is used only once, in line 8: "crowns, 10 [...] with uraeus on their fronts, on one every among them" ("on each among them").

Gallery

See also

Gardiner's Sign List#T. Warfare, Hunting, Butchery
Gardiner's Sign List#U. Agriculture, Crafts, and Professions
List of Egyptian hieroglyphs

References
Budge.  An Egyptian Hieroglyphic Dictionary, E.A.Wallace Budge, (Dover Publications), c 1978, (c 1920), Dover edition, 1978. (In two volumes) (softcover)
Budge.  The Rosetta Stone, E.A.Wallace Budge, (Dover Publications), c 1929, Dover edition(unabridged), 1989. (softcover)

Egyptian hieroglyphs: warfare-hunting-butchery
Egyptian hieroglyphs: arts and trades